Elsie Shutt (born 1928) is an American computer programmer and entrepreneur who founded Computations Incorporated (CompInc) in 1957 when she was not permitted to work part-time at home after she became pregnant. Shutt was notably one of the first women to start a software business not only in the United States but the entire world.

Early life and education
Elsie Shutt was born in New York City and grew up in Baltimore, Maryland. After her father died when she was four, her mother worked as a chemistry technician at Johns Hopkins Hospital. Shutt attended Eastern High School in Baltimore and graduated with an undergraduate degree at age 20 from Goucher College, from which her mother had also graduated with a degree in chemistry.  Shutt went on to complete a graduate fellowship at Radcliffe College in mathematics. She became the second-ever female teacher after Lisl Novak Gaal. Shutt taught remedial trigonometry to Harvard students, making her the first female graduate student to do so. Following this, Shutt was awarded a Fulbright scholarship to teach English in France.

Career

Early years 
Shutt learned to program on ENIAC successor ORDVAC (Ordnance Discrete Variable Automatic Computer) under Dick Clippinger during a summer job at U.S. Army's Aberdeen Proving Ground in Maryland. In 1953 Shutt was hired at Raytheon (an aerospace and defense manufacturing company) by her old boss, Dick Clippinger.  There, she started work on software for the Raycom computer.  When she became pregnant in 1957, Massachusetts state law required her to quit Raytheon. However, Raytheon began to refer Shutt to their clients because the company was scaling back its outside programming projects. Shutt began doing freelance programming work from her home. This work was done for over a year with her friend Irma Wyman. Shutt eventually decided to pursue the entrepreneurial venture of starting a business that would give women part-time work in this technical field, an opportunity that was nonexistent before.

Computations Incorporated 
Shutt founded Computations Incorporated (Comp Inc.) in 1957, as a primarily all-female company in the early era when software companies worked part-time from homes as freelancers. Comp Inc., a Harvard, Massachusetts-based company, utilized systems analysis, and design along with programming help for both the business and scientific industries. Early employees, Elaine Kamowitz and Barbara Wade, who previously worked as freelancers before being incorporated, also bore children. Shutt reportedly refused to hire more than 13 staff members and led the company for more than 45 years. At the time, it was highly unusual for pregnant women to continue in their professional endeavors, leading some to dub Shutt and her employees  "the pregnant programmers." She began Comp Inc. to prove that women could still hold programming occupations while taking care of a family—having a baby did not detract from their technical expertise.  Shutt employed preferential hiring of young women with little children. She hoped that by doing this she would increase a woman's chance of getting a full-time job as a programmer once her children grew up. Even women with no experience were hired because there was a training program in place. Comp Inc.'s employees were mainly women with a few men, but all the partners were women. The company's primary clients were the United States government and the science, education, and business industries. Computations, Inc. also emphasized “desk-checking” between employees (manually checking each other's code), and clients claimed they saved as much as 50% by outsourcing to Shutt's company. At its peak, her company entered into contracts with Minneapolis-Honeywell, Raytheon, St. Regis Paper Co., Harvard University, The University of Rochester, and the United States Air Force.

Personal life 
Shutt had the support of her husband, both emotionally, financially, and domestically, and even hired a babysitter to work every Wednesday, so she could offer that day without having to tell the client she would have to look for a sitter. She enjoyed the days with her children and would rent computer time from companies during “non-prime times” who wanted to keep their computers on in the evening.

References

Further reading
"Mixing Math and Motherhood." Business Week, March 2, 1963, 86.

1928 births
Living people
American computer programmers
American women business executives
American business executives
Goucher College alumni
Radcliffe fellows
Businesspeople from New York City
Businesspeople from Baltimore
20th-century American businesspeople
20th-century American businesswomen
21st-century American women